Cross County High School is a public high school located in unincorporated Cross County, Arkansas,  from Cherry Valley, and operated by the Cross County School District. The school educates 7–12th grade students.

It draws students from Cherry Valley, Hickory Ridge and Vanndale.

Cross County High School is part of the New Tech Network (NTN) schools which use Project Based Learning. The Cross County Thunderbirds won the 1984 Arkansas State Championship in AA football.

References

Schools in Cross County, Arkansas
Educational institutions in the United States with year of establishment missing
Public high schools in Arkansas